Élisabeth Hubert (born 26 May 1956) is a French doctor, politician and businesswoman. She was first elected to Parliament in 1986 to the 2nd District of Loire-Atlantique. In 1996 she became Minister for Health under the first government of Alain Juppé. She was CEO of Laboratoires Fournier from 1997 to 2004 then of Alliagis.

References

Politicians of the French Fifth Republic
1956 births
Living people
Women government ministers of France